Sornfelli is a mountain plateau on the island of Streymoy in the Faroe Islands about 12 km from the capital Tórshavn (20 km by road). It is the site of a  military station at 725m above sea level (asl). The Sornfelli Meteorological Station installed in 1999 is located in the middle of the 40,000 m2 Sornfelli Mountain top plateau, also at 725m asl.

Temperatures at the meteorological station in 2000 were:
Mean annual air temperature: +1.7 °C
Mean coldest month (April): -2.2 °C
Mean warmest month (August): 6.5 °C

From Tórshavn you can drive over the mountain road "Oyggjarvegin" to the Sornfelli Mountain plateau. There is a public road up to the Sornfelli Mountain plateau, but not the last 200 m to the radar base.
The mountain of Sornfelli has a height of 749m.

References

 

Mountains of the Faroe Islands
Meteorological stations